
Gmina Złota is a rural gmina (administrative district) in Pińczów County, Świętokrzyskie Voivodeship, in south-central Poland.

The gmina contains parts of the protected areas called Kozubów Landscape Park and Nida Landscape Park.

Villages
Gmina Złota contains the villages and settlements of Biskupice, Chroberz, Górki Kostrzeszyńskie, Graby, Kolonie Pełczyskie, Korce, Kostrzeszyn, Łobodzie, Lubowiec, Miernów, Młynek, Niegosławice, Nieprowice, Odrzywół, Olbrych, Pełczyska, Probołowice, Rudawa, Stawiszyce, Wojsławice, Wola Chroberska, Wymysłów, Żabiniec, Złota and Żurawniki.

Neighbouring gminas
Gmina Złota is bordered by the gminas of Czarnocin, Pińczów and Wiślica.

References
 Polish official population figures 2006

Zlota
Pińczów County